Kumbakonam Sarangapani (1904-1984) was an Indian actor who worked mainly in Tamil cinema. Though primarily a comedian, he occasionally played roles of hero and villain.

Family 

Sarangapani was born in 1904 in Kumbakonam, Tanjore district. His parents were Shivakolunthu and Jagadambal. Sarangapani was the youngest of his three brothers Periya Rajanna (Artist), Thambussamy (Mrudangam Vidwaan), Chinna Rajanna (Nadaswara Vidwaan) and his Sister Ambaal Ammal.

Sarangapani was married to Thayalnayaki. He had three sons and a daughter. As a follower of the freedom movement, he named his children as Gandhi Padamanbhan, Vijayalakshmi Pandit, Bhaskara Patel and Subash Chandra Bose.

Drama 

Belonging to a family involved in music performance, his love towards arts was in his genes. At the age of seven, Sarangapani had wandered behind a drama advertising bullock cart and joined Jagannatha Iyer Company. It was here he learned to sing, dance and act. During his early days, he mostly performed "Stree part" – a woman role. Later, he started acting in comedy and lead roles in various dramas.

He moved from Jagannatha Iyer Company and Joined Nawab Rajamanikyam Pillai Company. This company traveled the length and breadth of the state and also to Sri Lanka to perform various dramas.

Sarangapani got his break in movies while performing for Devi Bala Vinoda Sangeeta Sabha in Coimbatore.  Though he became busy in movies, he never stopped performing in dramas.

Hero and Villain 

Though Sarangapani has acted as a comedian in most of the films, he was the main  star in "Rambhaiyin Kaadal".  In Andhaman Kaidi, Sarangapani deftly played a villain role as well, in movies such as Andhaman Kaithi (1952).

Awards 

Sarangapani was conferred with Tamil Nadu State Award – Kalaimamani in the year of 1964. He was also given the "Raja Sando" Award for lifetime contribution to films in the year of 1982 by His Excellency Neelam Sanjeeva Reddy.

Relationship with Anna 

Though a staunch Congress party man, Sarangapani had friends in all parties.

When Arignar Anna was diagnosed with cancer and was admitted in Adyar, Sarangapani was a daily visitor. He visited a temple to perform pooja in the name of Anna and would bring kumkum as prasadam and apply it to his forehead. Anna, an atheist, would not remove the kumkum from his forehead, as a mark of  respect to his friendship.

Filmography

References

External links 
 
 A Brief Note on K. Sarangapani In My Movie Minutes

Indian male film actors
Year of death missing
People from Thanjavur district
1904 births